Indian Railways (IR), Indian Railway Catering and Tourism Corporation (IRCTC) and different state governments provide a variety of luxury rail travel in India. These are:

References

External links

 List of luxury tourist trains at Indian Railways website
 A Traveler’s Experience with the Maharajas' Express

Hospitality industry in India